Erraez and Herraez are variations of the same Sephardi surname. (Judaeo-Spanish: Sefardies) This pedigree belong to a sub-group known as Spanish and Portuguese Jews, whose families remained in Spain and Portugal as ostensible Christians (after the Alhambra decree of 1492) and later reverted to Judaism in France and Italy, some of whom emigrated to the New World in the 18th century as conversos, particularly to Mexico, the Caribbean and South America.

Some people with these names include:

Juan Garrido Herráez (1951–), Spanish politician
Miguel Herráez (1957–), Spanish writer

Other Sephardic families:

Abravanel
Abulafia
Alazrague 
Barzel
Casal
Cohen
Cardozo
Carneiro
Donatez
Damuz
De Castro
Eleazar
Espina
Ezra
Falcon
Fierres
Fonseca
Gamarra
Gazy
Gershom
Harari
Huete
Ibrahim
Izradiel
Jalaf
Jerez
Joel
Kohen
Lanery
Levi
Manrique
Marsel
Montiel
Mose
Nucaty
Nunez
Obadias
Ormaza
Palat
Rangel
Saavedra
Seixas
Talavera
Tesat
Torrijos
Uziel
Valenty
Xaquez
Yzcadarani
Zacarias

See also

History of the Jews in Latin America
History of the Jews in Spain
Crypto-Jews
Jewish name
Jewish ethnic divisions

External links
Sephardic Genealogy in South America
Sephardic Genealogy
2006 Jewish statistics around the World